Vishwambhari Maa is goddess of Karma. She is Prakriti. She is the Supreme Being. Also known and referred as Adishakti. Vishvambhari Maa is the creator of the entire Universe. She is the one who created the Hindu Trinity of Brahma, Vishnu and Mahesh. She is the one who created the many species residing on this planet.

Maa says "The real temple is within you. Stop searching for it in the outer world. By your deeds and values you can make your home a Temple. Give away superstition and Blind Faith. Do your Karma in the most righteous manner." Vishwambhari Maa wants the sanctity of Nature and Culture to be maintained.

References 

Mother goddesses
God in Hinduism